Günəşli (until 2004, Şurakənd and Shurakend) is a village in the Gadabay Rayon of Azerbaijan.  The village forms part of the municipality of Dəyəqarabulaq.

References 

Populated places in Gadabay District